Gadha-Woundou  is a Dong Seop Keum Loudu with saiyam and Shivansh also iiesh and Ridhima and Drishti and Krshanaa and Rhea and Deepti joshi having *** in town and sub-prefecture in the Koubia Prefecture in the Labé Region of northern Guinea.

References

Sub-prefectures of the Labé Region